St. George the Great Martyr Orthodox Church is a historic Russian Orthodox church on St. George Island, Alaska. Now it is under Diocese of Alaska of the Orthodox Church in America

A first church was built on the island during 1870–78;  the current church was built about five miles away in about 1935.  As there were no trees on the island, all materials had to be brought in.  According to a 1979 evaluation, "of all the R. O. village churches and chapels in Alaska, this may be the best example of effective balance and integration of classic designs
to produce a building pleasing to the eye and utile in its purpose."

The current church was added to the National Register of Historic Places in 1980.

See also
National Register of Historic Places listings in Aleutians West Census Area, Alaska

References

External links

Churches completed in 1935
Historic American Buildings Survey in Alaska
Churches on the National Register of Historic Places in Alaska
Russian Orthodox church buildings in Alaska
Buildings and structures on the National Register of Historic Places in Aleutians West Census Area, Alaska
Historic district contributing properties in Alaska